Falsettoland is a musical with a book by James Lapine and music and lyrics by William Finn.

Following In Trousers and March of the Falsettos, it is the third in a trio of one-act musicals centering on Marvin, his wife Trina, his psychiatrist Mendel, his son Jason, and his gay lover Whizzer Brown. In this chapter of Marvin's life, Jason is preparing for his bar mitzvah and Whizzer is suffering from a mysterious, life-threatening, as yet undefined illness, which the audience recognizes is AIDS. It forms the second act of the 1992 Broadway musical Falsettos, with March of the Falsettos as the first act.

Productions
Falsettoland opened Off-Broadway at Playwrights Horizons on June 28, 1990 and closed on August 12, 1990.

The musical transferred to the Lucille Lortel Theatre on September 25, 1990 and closed on January 27, 1991 after 176 performances. Directed by Lapine, the cast included Michael Rupert (Marvin), Faith Prince (Trina), Stephen Bogardus (Whizzer), Chip Zien (later replaced by Lonny Price) (Mendel), Heather MacRae (Dr. Charlotte) and Janet Metz (Cordelia).

A cast recording was released by DRG Records.

Synopsis
The year is 1981. Mendel the psychiatrist shines a flashlight into the audience on a dark stage, welcoming us to "Falsettoland," the conclusion to March of the Falsettos. The cast has been enlarged by two, Marvin's lesbian neighbors Dr. Charlotte, an internist, and Cordelia, a "shiksa" caterer.  Marvin has realized that it's "About Time" that he grows up and gets over himself. He has called a truce with Trina, and he has managed to maintain his relationship with Jason, who is now preparing for his Bar Mitzvah. He has not seen his ex-boyfriend Whizzer for two years and has still not gotten over him.

One day, when she arrives to take custody of Jason for the week, Trina informs Marvin that it is now time to start planning Jason's Bar Mitzvah, probably the last pleasant thing the ex-couple will ever do together. The pair immediately starts bickering, to Jason's dismay and Mendel's amusement. Mendel encourages them to have a simple party, but Trina (and Cordelia, the caterer) will have none of it. It is the "Year of the Child" after all, the year that every Jewish parent dreams of: the year their child is bar mitzvahed, and they can spend insane amounts of money celebrating.

The scene moves to Jason's Little League Baseball game. While at bat, Jason has a lot more on his mind than the game. He is trying to decide which girls to invite to his bar mitzvah: the girls he should invite, or the girls he "wants" to invite; reaching a discussion in this delicate situation would be a "Miracle of Judaism." Everyone is sitting "watching Jewish boys who can't play baseball" and getting a little too into it, when Whizzer suddenly arrives: Jason had asked him to come ("The Baseball Game"). Marvin is struck by how little he's aged, and a tentative offer of reconciliation is offered just as Jason, miracle of miracles (and thanks to some helpful batting advice from Whizzer), actually hits the ball. He's so shocked, he forgets to run.

An interlude: "A Day in Falsettoland." In Part One, "Dr. Mendel at Work," Mendel listens to the blather of a yuppie patient and agonizes over being a 1960s shrink stuck in the 1980s, and how his work is taking a toll on his marriage to Trina. In Part Two, "Trina Works It Out," Trina reveals Marvin and Whizzer are back and wonders why that is bothering her. In Part Three, "The Neighbors Relax," Mendel and Trina jog and discuss Marvin and the bar mitzvah, and Dr. Charlotte comes home to Cordelia cooking "nouvelle bar mitzvah cuisine." Cordelia asks Charlotte how her day was at the hospital, and Charlotte exclaims that today was a rare day without a death. Meanwhile, Marvin and Whizzer play racquetball and bicker when Whizzer beats Marvin soundly. All reflect on how wonderful life is.

The peace doesn't last long. Marvin and Trina are warring over every single aspect of the bar mitzvah, which makes Jason want to just call the whole thing off ("Round Tables, Square Tables"). It is up to Mendel to console the boy, telling him that "Everyone Hates His Parents" at his age, but everyone also gets past it and moves on to hate them less.

Marvin sits in bed one morning, looking at the sleeping Whizzer, wondering at how much he loves him ("What More Can I Say?"). Dr. Charlotte, meanwhile, has started to become aware that "Something Bad is Happening" among young gay men in the city, who arrive at the hospital sick with a mysterious illness that no one seems to know anything about. Rumors are spreading, but the disease is spreading faster. Then Whizzer collapses during a game of racquetball ("More Racquetball").

As Whizzer enters the hospital with a disease that the audience immediately knows to be AIDS, Trina begins to see her world fall apart around her as someone she shouldn't care about but does anyway is clearly sick. She is barely "Holding to the Ground" and this blow to her family may just be too hard to handle.

In Whizzer's hospital room, the entire cast gathers to cheer him up, everyone commenting on how good he looks. Marvin provides love, Cordelia chicken soup and Mendel some terrible jokes. Everyone agrees that it's "Days Like This" that make these secular Jews believe in God. Only Jason, in childish honesty, is able to tell Whizzer the truth: that he looks awful.

Mendel and Trina sit Jason down and give Jason the option of "Canceling the Bar Mitzvah" if he feels he can't go through with it, and Jason is finally told that Whizzer may not recover. Marvin sits in Whizzer's hospital room, soon joined by the Lesbians, and the four "Unlikely Lovers" wonder how much longer their love can last.

As Whizzer's condition worsens, Jason turns to God, asking him to let Whizzer get better ("Another Miracle of Judaism"); he'll even get bar mitzvahed if Whizzer gets better. But it's to no avail, because, as Dr. Charlotte reiterates, "Something Bad is Happening" to Whizzer ("Something Bad Is Happening (reprise)"). He is soon deathly ill, and he steels himself to meet his maker, reflecting bravely that "You Gotta Die Sometime."

Suddenly, everyone bursts into the hospital room. Jason has had an epiphany: he wants to hold his bar mitzvah in Whizzer's hospital room so he can be there ("Jason's Bar Mitzvah"). Trina couldn't be prouder, and everyone, for some reason, can only think how much Jason looks like Marvin. Jason is bar mitzvahed, entering Adulthood as Whizzer begins to leave his, for Whizzer can suddenly take no more, and is taken out of the room.

Marvin is left alone. He sits and reflects on his relationship with Whizzer ("What Would I Do?"). Whizzer appears, dressed as we first saw him, and the two sing together one last time, and then Whizzer is gone. Marvin is comforted by his family, now short a member, as Mendel bids us goodnight from the crazy, sad world known as "Falsettoland."

Song list
Falsettoland
About Time
Year of the Child
Miracle of Judaism
Watching Jason (Baseball)
A Day in Falsettoland
Racquetball
The Argument(renamed and reworked from "Round Tables, Square Tables")
Everyone Hates His Parents
What More Can I Say
Something Bad is Happening
Racquetball 2
Holding to the Ground
Days Like This
Canceling the Bar Mitzvah
Unlikely Lovers
Another Miracle of Judaism
You Gotta Die Sometime
Jason's Bar Mitzvah
What Would I Do?

Awards and nominations
The musical won the 1991 Lucille Lortel Award for Outstanding Musical; the 1991 Drama Desk Award for Outstanding Lyrics, (William Finn); and the 1991 Outer Critics Circle Award for Best Off-Broadway Musical.

References

External links
 Official website

1990 musicals
Off-Broadway musicals
LGBT-related musicals
Musicals by James Lapine
Musicals by William Finn
Plays set in New York City
One-act musicals
Original musicals